The Apalachicola Fort Site is an archaeological site near Holy Trinity, Alabama, United States. Spain established a wattle and daub blockhouse here on the Chattahoochee River in 1690 in an attempt to maintain influence among the Lower Creek people. Abandoned after about one year of use and rediscovered in 1956, it was investigated by archaeologists and is now owned by the county. It is not open to the public. It was declared a National Historic Landmark in 1964.

Setting
The Apalachicola Fort Site is located in a rural setting in eastern Russell County, Alabama, on a bluff overlooking the Chattahoochee River a few miles from the Holy Trinity monastery. The site was chosen by the Spanish governor of La Florida, Don Diego De Quiroga y Losada, for its proximity to Apalachicola, the principal town of the Lower Creeks.

History
The Spanish governor was concerned over the encroachment of English traders from the Province of Carolina into Spanish territory, where they provided local Native Americans with a broader selection and higher quality of trade goods than Spanish traders did.  This fort was built in an attempt to extend Spanish influence into the northernmost reaches of its claimed territory.  The effect of the constructing the fort was that the local Creeks, instead of staying with the Spanish, migrated to English-controlled areas.  This move undermined the purpose of the fort, which was already encumbered by a long supply line.  It was consequently abandoned after just one year of use, and largely demolished by the Spanish prior to their departure.

Although the Creek village was later reoccupied, the Creeks were forced out of the area in the 19th century by American Indian removal policy.  The site lay abandoned and unknown until 1956, when archaeologists and one of the monastery's monks worked to locate the site from the few surviving records.  Subsequent archaeological digs confirmed the find, and led to its designation as a National Historic Landmark.  The site, located on privately held farmland, was turned over to the county in 1971.  It is not open to the public.

See also
List of National Historic Landmarks in Alabama
National Register of Historic Places listings in Russell County, Alabama

References

National Register of Historic Places in Russell County, Alabama
National Historic Landmarks in Alabama
Geography of Russell County, Alabama
Archaeological sites in Alabama
Archaeological sites on the National Register of Historic Places in Alabama
Colonial forts in Alabama
Forts on the National Register of Historic Places in Alabama